March 5 - Eastern Orthodox liturgical calendar - March 7

All fixed commemorations below are observed on March 19 by Orthodox Churches on the Old Calendar.

For March 6th, Orthodox Churches on the Old Calendar commemorate the Saints listed on February 21 (February 22 on leap years).

Saints

 Monk-martyrs Conon, and his son Conon, of Iconium (270-275)
 Martyrs Cyriacus and 12 companions, who suffered under Diocletian in Augsburg (c. 304)
 Martyr Euphrosynus, in boiling water.
 Monk-martyr Maximus, by stoning.
 Uncovering of the Precious Cross and the Precious Nails by the Empress St Helena in Jerusalem (326)
 Venerable Arcadius, monk of Cyprus (361), and his disciples Julian and Euboulos.
 Saint Arkadios, Archbishop of Cyprus (527–565)
 Venerable Hesychius the Wonderworker.  (see also: March 5)
 The holy 42 Martyrs of Amorium (in Phrygia), including:
 Passion-bearers Constantine, Aetius, Theophilus, Theodore, Melissenus, Callistus, Basoes, and others, in Samarra (845)

Pre-Schism Western saints

 Saint Marcian of Tortona (120)
 Saint Patrick of Avernia (ca. 307)
 Saint Basil of Bologna, Bishop of Bologna in Italy for twenty years, 315-335 (335)
 Saint Fridolin of Säckingen, abbot, Enlightener of the Upper Rhine (540)
 Saints Kyneburga, Kyneswide and Tibba, female members of the Mercian royal family in 7th century England (c. 680)
 Saint Baldred of Tyninghame (Balther), a priest in Lindisfarne in England who became a hermit at Tyningham on the Scottish border (756)
 Saint Chrodegang of Metz, Bishop of Metz in the east of France, he took part in several Councils (766)
 Saint Bilfrid (Billfrith), a hermit at Lindisfarne and an expert goldsmith, who bound in gold the Lindisfarne Gospels, written and illuminated by Bishop Edfrith (8th century)
 Saint Cathróe of Metz (Cadroe, Cadroel) (976)

Post-Schism Orthodox saints

 Venerable Job (Joshua in schema) of Anzersk Island, Solovki (1720)

Other commemorations

 Translation to Vladimir (1230) of the relics of Martyr Abraham of the Bulgars on the Volga (1229)
 Repose of Helen Kontzevitch, Church writer (1989)

Icons

 "Chenstokhovskaya" (Poland) Icon of the Most Holy Theotokos (Black Madonna of Częstochowa).
 "Blessed Heaven" (Moscow) Icon of the Most Holy Theotokos.
 The Shestokhovsk ("Hearth"), or Sheltomezhsk, Icon of the Mother of God (18th century)

Icon gallery

Notes

References

Sources
 March 6/March 19. Orthodox Calendar (PRAVOSLAVIE.RU).
 March 19 / March 6. HOLY TRINITY RUSSIAN ORTHODOX CHURCH (A parish of the Patriarchate of Moscow).
 March 6. OCA - The Lives of the Saints.
 The Autonomous Orthodox Metropolia of Western Europe and the Americas (ROCOR). St. Hilarion Calendar of Saints for the year of our Lord 2004. St. Hilarion Press (Austin, TX). pp. 19–20.
 March 6. Latin Saints of the Orthodox Patriarchate of Rome.
 The Roman Martyrology. Transl. by the Archbishop of Baltimore. Last Edition, According to the Copy Printed at Rome in 1914. Revised Edition, with the Imprimatur of His Eminence Cardinal Gibbons. Baltimore: John Murphy Company, 1916. pp. 67–68.
 Rev. Richard Stanton. A Menology of England and Wales, or, Brief Memorials of the Ancient British and English Saints Arranged According to the Calendar, Together with the Martyrs of the 16th and 17th Centuries. London: Burns & Oates, 1892. pp. 102–105.
Greek Sources
 Great Synaxaristes:  6 ΜΑΡΤΙΟΥ. ΜΕΓΑΣ ΣΥΝΑΞΑΡΙΣΤΗΣ.
  Συναξαριστής. 6 Μαρτίου. ECCLESIA.GR. (H ΕΚΚΛΗΣΙΑ ΤΗΣ ΕΛΛΑΔΟΣ). 
Russian Sources
  19 марта (6 марта). Православная Энциклопедия под редакцией Патриарха Московского и всея Руси Кирилла (электронная версия). (Orthodox Encyclopedia - Pravenc.ru).
  6 марта (ст.ст.) 19 марта 2013 (нов. ст.). Русская Православная Церковь Отдел внешних церковных связей. (DECR).

March in the Eastern Orthodox calendar